This is a list of commercial banks in Mauritius.

See also
 Bank of Mauritius
 List of companies of Mauritius
 List of banks in Africa

References

External links
Details view on the banks of Mauritius, offers & special services

 
Banks
Mauritius
Mauritius